Crush is a 2013 American direct-to-video thriller film directed by Malik Bader and written by Sonny Mallhi. Starring Lucas Till, Crystal Reed, and Sarah Bolger, it follows a popular high school student portrayed by Till who finds himself being stalked.

The film was released on DVD and Blu-ray in the United States on April 9, 2013. It received mixed reviews from critics and generated $8.12 million over a $1.2 million budget.

Plot
High school student Scott gains popularity among his classmates for his prowess on the soccer field, which he seeks to turn into an athletic scholarship. Although he possesses artistic talent, Scott continues to focus on soccer, even after a leg injury threatens to jeopardize his playing days. His best friend Jules harbors romantic feelings for him, but Scott resists her advances to prevent ruining their friendship. Also romantically interested in Scott is Bess, a shy student who recognizes his artistic abilities. Bess herself becomes a love interest of her classmate Jeffrey, although she does not return his feelings as she develops an unhealthy obsession with Scott.

An unknown stalker emerges in Scott's life, who begins demonstrating disturbing behavior. The stalker's actions turn violent when Mrs. Brown, a teacher who flirted with Scott, is attacked and seriously injured, while Jules is nearly killed by the stalker during a party. Scott suspects Bess is responsible, aware of her feelings for him, but recognizes that he cannot prove that she is his stalker. Later, while driving, Scott accidentally hits Bess' co-worker Andie and offers to take her home upon noticing that she sustained a leg injury. However, Andie knocks Scott out when he enters her house, revealing herself as the stalker, before trapping him in her basement.

Scott attempts to escape after he awakens, but Andie agitates his leg injury. After Andie kills her boss David when he arrives at the house, Scott makes another escape attempt and manages to crawl out of the basement, despite sustaining further leg injuries. Bess visits the house soon afterwards, where she discovers Scott and David's body, prompting Andie to attack her. Although Andie gets the upper hand, Jeffrey shows up to help overpower her and Scott kicks Andie into the basement, knocking her out.

Unable to play soccer because of his injuries, Scott begins to work on applying for art school while he enters into a relationship with Jules. Bess and Jeffrey also begin their own relationship. Andie is visited by her attorney Mr. Graham, to whom she admits her killings began at an early age and warns that she will not remain in custody for long.

Cast
 Lucas Till as Scott
 Crystal Reed as Bess
 Sarah Bolger as Jules
 Caitríona Balfe as Andie
 Ashleigh Craig as Young Andie
 Reid Ewing as Jeffrey
 Leigh Whannell as David
 Holt McCallany as Mike
 Derrick Kemp as Brock
 Camille Guaty as Mrs. Brown
 Michael Landes as Mr. Graham
 Isaiah Mustafa as Coach Evans

Additionally, Meredith Salenger appears as Bess' mother and Nikki SooHoo appears as Maya. Cody Hamilton portrays the boy killed by Andie at the beginning of the film.

Critical reception
Writing for FEARnet, Scott Weinberg praised the acting of the three leads but criticized the film's "paper-thin premise" and script for being derivative (pointing out Mallhi's previous work on 2011's The Roommate), and said "Even putting aside the casual plagiarism in Mallhi's screenplays, there's nothing here in the way of character, suspense, intensity, or surprises. It's just someone telling the same old story with slightly different character." Ian Sedensky of Culture Crypt gave the film a score of 45/100 and judged: "The young cast is attractive, the production is well put together, and the twist, however absurd, might be genuinely shocking and entertaining to some. But this is a movie about a crush. And buying into the thin motivations behind this obsession requires a level of crazy reserved exclusively for the characters in this movie." John Strand of Best-Horror-Movies awarded the film 2.5/5 "Freakheads" (the site's rating system), and concluded the film is "A neat little thriller that will appeal to teens and young adults who are not interested in scares and gore, but like a fairly executed, albeit predictable, storyline."

References

External links

2010s thriller films
2013 direct-to-video films
2013 films
Direct-to-video thriller films
Intrepid Pictures films
Backwoods slasher films
American slasher films
Films about stalking
2010s English-language films
2010s American films